Jean Thore (13 October 1762, Montaut(-les-Créneaux) – 27 April 1823, Dax) was a French botanist and physician who practiced medicine in the town of Dax.

In 1808 Bory de Saint-Vincent circumscribed the algae genus of Thorea in his honor; the genus Thoreochloa Holub also bears his name. This is a synonym of Arrhenatherum.

Published works 
 Essai d'une chloris du Département des Landes, 1803.
 Promenade sur les côtes du golfe de Gascogne, 1810.

References 

1762 births
1823 deaths
19th-century French botanists
People from Landes (department)
18th-century French botanists